(also written 2014 OO6) is an Apollo near-Earth asteroid discovered in 2014 and was the most dangerous one discovered in 2014 that remained on the Sentry Risk Table as of early December 2014. However, the nominal best-fit orbit shows that  will be  from Earth on 11 January 2051.

It was discovered on 27 July 2014 by Pan-STARRS at an apparent magnitude of 20 using a  Ritchey–Chrétien telescope. On 18 August 2014 the asteroid passed  from Earth. By 23 August 2014, the asteroid had dimmed to below magnitude 25. As of early December 2014, the asteroid had an observation arc of 24 days with an uncertainty parameter of 7.  was recovered by Cerro Paranal Observatory on 23 and 26 December 2014 at magnitude 25 which extended the observation arc from 24 days to 154 days. The orbital refinement removed the impact risk for 11 January 2051.

With an absolute magnitude of 23.1, the asteroid is about 60–140 meters in diameter.

See also
List of asteroid close approaches to Earth in 2014

References

External links 
 
 
 

Minor planet object articles (unnumbered)

20140824
20140727